Lucas Celler is an American documentary film editor, director, photographer and motion designer. He is best known for his work on Shirkers and Claydream.

Life and career
Lucas went to New Trier High School and Depaul University's School of Cinematic Arts in Chicago. He then moved to Los Angeles to intern for Chris Hanley. He served as assistant editor on Jeff Feuerzeig's Author: The JT LeRoy Story. He got his start editing feature documentary film on Shirkers which won him the Cinema Eye Honors Award for Outstanding Achievement in Graphic Design.

Filmography

Awards and nominations

References

External links
 
 

Living people
American Cinema Editors
American film editors
American documentary film directors
Year of birth missing (living people)